Enock Brian Wanyama is Kenyan professional footballer who plays as a winger for Kenyan Premier League side FC Kariobangi Sharks.

Career
Wanyama started out at Nkoroi FC before moving to South B United Sports Academy (SUSA), a team he played for while at Highway Secondary School. He later moved to Ligi Ndogo S.C., played for Kenya U20 in Nov-Dec 2020 during the 2021 Africa U-20 Cup of Nations qualification then travelled to Slovakia and tried out with FK Pohronie (FORTUNA LIGA) later joining Kenyan Premiership side F.C. Kariobangi Sharks in the year 2021.

Awards
Wanyama was named the Most Valuable Player in 2018 after as South B United won Chapa Dimba na Safaricom Nairobi regional finals. He later made the All-Star team that toured Spain for ten days.

References

External links
 Enock Wanyama at Chapa Dimba

2001 births
Living people
Kenyan footballers
Kenyan Premier League players
F.C. Kariobangi Sharks players